The 1988 AFC Asian Cup was the 9th edition of the men's AFC Asian Cup, a quadrennial international association football tournament organised by the Asian Football Confederation (AFC). The finals were held in Qatar between 2 December and 18 December 1988. Saudi Arabia defeated South Korea in the final match in Doha.

Qualification

Squads

Venues

First round
All times are Qatar time (UTC+3)

Group A

Group B

Knockout stage
All times are Qatar time (UTC+3)

{{Round4-with third
|widescore=yes
|RD1=Semi-finals
|RD2=Final
|Consol=Third place

|December 14 - Doha| |2||1
|December 15 - Doha||1||0

|December 18 - Doha||0 (3)| (pen.)|0 (4)

|December 17 - Doha||0 (0)| (pen.)|0 (3)
}}

Semi-finals

Third place play-off

Final

Statistics
Goalscorers

With three goals, South Korea's Lee Tae-Ho is the top scorer in the tournament. In total, 40 goals were scored by 28 different players, with only one of them credited as an own goal.3 goals:  Lee Tae-ho2 goals:  Ma Lin
  Xie Yuxin
  Farshad Pious
  Byun Byung-joo
  Chung Hae-won
  Hwang Sun-hong
  Kim Joo-sung
  Adel Khamis
  Mansour Muftah
  Khalid Salman1 goal: Fahad Mohamed
 Gao Sheng
 Mai Chao
 Zhang Xiaowen
 Karim Bavi
 Adel Abbas
 Mansour Basha
 Saleh Al-Mutlaq
 Mohamed Al-Suwaiyed
 Fahad Al-Bishi
 Yousuf Jazea'a
 Majed Abdullah
 Walid Abu Al-Sel
 Walid Al-Nasser
 Hassan Mohamed
 Abdulaziz Mohamed1 own goal Muhsin Musabah (for Qatar)

AwardsMost Valuable Player Kim Joo-sungTop scorer Lee Tae-hoBest Goalkeeper Zhang HuikangBest Forward Lee Tae-hoTeam of the Tournament'''

Final standings

References

External links
RSSSF Details

 
AFC Asian Cup tournaments
AFC
International association football competitions hosted by Qatar
1988–89 in Qatari football
AFC Asian Cup